A Blow for Me, a Toot to You is a 1977 album by funk musician Fred Wesley and the Horny Horns featuring Maceo Parker.

Reception

The album contains heavy participation by the P-Funk musical collective, including Garry Shider, Michael Hampton, and Jerome Brailey. The album also contains the heavily sampled track "Four Play" which, due to its title, prevented the track from garnering airplay when it was released as a single.

The album was produced by George Clinton and Bootsy Collins, and was reissued in 1993, first by P-Vine records in Japan, then by Sequel Records in the UK, and lastly AEM in the U.S.. The reissue contains two new remixes of the tracks "Four Play" and "A Blow for Me, a Toot to You", as well as an interview with George Clinton discussing the recording's background. Years later, WEA released both Horny Horns albums on a two-CD set, in the UK.

Track listing

Bonus tracks on the CD reissue

Personnel
Fred Wesley (trombone), Maceo Parker (saxophone), Rick Gardner (trumpet), Richard "Kush" Griffith (trumpet) - horns
Brecker Brothers - additional horns
Jerome Brailey, Frankie "Kash" Waddy, Bootsy Collins - drums
Glenn Goins, Garry Shider, Michael Hampton, Bootsy Collins, Phelps Collins - guitar
Bootsy Collins - bass
Bernie Worrell - keyboards
Fred Wesley, Maceo Parker, Rick Gardner, Richard Griffith, George Clinton, Bootsy Collins, Gary "Mudbone" Cooper, Lynn Mabry, Dawn Silva, Taka Khan, Bernie Worrell, Phelps Collins, Randy Crawford, Robert "P-Nut" Johnson - vocals
Technical
Jim Callon, Jim Vitti - engineer
Ronald "Stozo" Edwards - cover illustration

Charts

Singles

Samples and covers
Gang Starr sampled "Four Play" for the title track of their album Step in the Arena (1991). 
Raw Fusion sampled "Peace Fugue"  on their song "Freaky Note", on their album Hoochiefied Funk (1994).
Nas sampled "Peace Fugue"  on his song "Life We Chose", on his album Nastradamus (1999).
Digital Underground sampled "Four Play" on their song "Packet Man", on their album Sex Packets (1990).

External links
 Fred Wesley and the Horny Horns-A Blow for Me, a Toot to You at Discogs

References

What It Is! Funky Soul and Rare Grooves-Rhino Records 2006

1977 debut albums
The Horny Horns albums
Atlantic Records albums